Laursen is a Danish-Norwegian patronymic surname meaning "son of Laurs" (equivalent of Laurentius). A parallel form with a similar origin is Lauesen.
Laursen may refer to:

 Hans M. Laursen (1865–1916), American politician and businessman
 Isabella Arendt Laursen (born 1993), Danish politician
Jacob Laursen, (born 1971 ), Danish footballer
 Martin Laursen (born 1977), Danish footballer
 Per Laursen (born 1966), Danish darts player
 Ulrik Laursen (born 1976), Danish footballer
 Valdemar Laursen (1900–1989), Danish footballer
 Zindy Laursen (born 1971), Danish musician

See also
 Larsen

Danish-language surnames
Patronymic surnames